Charales is an order of freshwater green algae in the division Charophyta, class Charophyceae, commonly known as stoneworts. Depending on the treatment of the genus Nitellopsis, living (extant) species are placed into either one family (Characeae) or two (Characeae and Feistiellaceae). Further families are used for fossil members of the order. Linnaeus established the genus Chara in 1753.

Taxonomy
The higher level classification of green algae was unsettled . AlgaeBase places Charales within the class Charophyceae and its circumscription of the division Charophyta.

Families
The number of families and their division into genera varies. , AlgaeBase accepts two families containing some extant species and four families containing only fossil species:
Characeae S.F.Gray
Feistiellaceae Schudack
†Aclistocharaceae X.G.Zhou (may be included in Characeae)
†Atopocharaceae R.E.Peck (may be included in Clavatoraceae)
†Clavatoraceae Pia
†Porocharaceae Grambast
AlgaeBase places the genus Nitellopsis, which has both extant and extinct species, in the family Feistiellaceae. Other sources place Nitellopsis in the family Characeae, with Feistiellaceae containing only fossil species, so that all extant species are in the family Characeae. The Interim Register of Marine and Nonmarine Genera accepts a further three extinct families:
†Eocharaceae Grambast
†Palaeocharaceae Pia
†Raskyellaceae Grambast

References

Further reading
Bryant, J. The stoneworts (Chlorophyta, Charales). In Guiry, M.D., John, D.M., Rindi, F. and McCarthy, T.K. 2007. New Survey of Clare Island. Royal Irish Academy. .
Schaible, R. and Schubert, H. 2008. The occurrence of sexual Chara canesces populations (Charophyceae) is not related to ecophysiological potentials with respect to salinity and irradiance. Eur. J. Phycol. 43: 309 - 316.
Desai, Udaysingh and Karande C.T. 2008. "Biodiversity of Charophytes from Kolhapur District, Maharashtra". Shivaji University, Kolhapur.

External links
Images of Charales
University California
Chara curta in Ireland

Charophyta
Green algae orders